Green Pastures is a historic private summer estate near Squam Lake in Sandwich, New Hampshire.  The  property includes a main house, several 19th-century barns, a former district schoolhouse, and a small sap house converted to a writing cabin. The property belonged to the locally prominent Coolidge family until 1934, when they sold it to Rev. T. Guthrie Speers Sr., the first minister to preach at the Chocorua Island Chapel, for his use as a summer residence.

The property was listed on the National Register of Historic Places in 2016.

See also

National Register of Historic Places listings in Carroll County, New Hampshire

References

Houses on the National Register of Historic Places in New Hampshire
Houses completed in 1934
Houses in Carroll County, New Hampshire
National Register of Historic Places in Carroll County, New Hampshire
Sandwich, New Hampshire
1934 establishments in New Hampshire